Molybdenum dichloride dioxide is the inorganic compound with the formula MoO2Cl2. It is a yellow solid that is used as a precursor to other molybdenum compounds. It is a nonmolecular solid but is often encountered as its adducts MoO2Cl2(ether)2, which are soluble in organic solvents.  It is one of several oxychlorides of molybdenum.

Preparation
The compound is most easily prepared by treatment molybdenum trioxide with concentrated hydrochloric acid:
MoO3  +  2 HCl  →  MoO2Cl2  +  H2O

MoO2Cl2 can also be prepared from MoOCl4:
MoOCl4  +  O(Si(CH3)3)2  →  MoO2Cl2  +  2 ClSi(CH3)3

It is also prepared by chlorination of molybdenum dioxide:
MoO2  +  Cl2  →  MoO2Cl2

Reactions
MoO2Cl2 forms a variety of adducts, e.g. MoO2Cl2(thf)2.  With bulky anilines, it converts to the diimido complex MoCl2(NAr)2(dimethoxyethane).  This complex is the precursor to the Schrock carbenes of the type Mo(OR)2(NAr)(CH-t-Bu).

References

Molybdenum(VI) compounds
Oxychlorides